The molybdovanadate reagent is a solution containing both the molybdate and vanadate ions. It is commonly used in the determination of phosphate ion content. The reagent used is ammonium molybdovanadate with the addition of 70% perchloric acid (sulfuric acid is also known to be used). It is used for purposes such as the analysis of wine, canned fruits and other fruit-based products such as jams and syrups.

Physical properties 
The reagent appears as a clear, yellow liquid without odour. It is harmful if inhaled, a recognised carcinogen and can cause eye burns.

References

Reagents
Analytical chemistry
Food science